The 1893 Case football team was an American football team that represented the Case School of Applied Science in Cleveland, Ohio, now a part of Case Western Reserve University. Playing as an independent during the 1893 college football season, the team compiled a 4–0 record, outscoring opponents by a total of 120 to 8. 

Case snapped a 13-game win streak of Oberlin, whose win streak dated back to their undefeated 1892 season.  Notably, Case defeated Coach John Heisman of Buchtel, handing him his first ever career coaching loss, who ironically was the coach of the undefeated 1892 Oberlin team the prior season.

Charley Gleason was the star halfback, who also previously played on the 1889 Georgetown football team. Captain Alva C. Smith played quarterback.

Schedule

References

Case
Case Western Reserve Spartans football seasons
College football undefeated seasons
Case football